Urbania is a 2000 independent drama film based on the play Urban Folk Tales. It was nominated for the Grand Jury Prize at the 2000 Sundance Film Festival, then played the Toronto International Film Festival, the Seattle Film Festival, and a number of LGBT film festivals, winning a total of 6 "Best Film" awards.  It was released by Lionsgate and was named "One of the Year's Best Films" in over 35 publications including the Los Angeles Times, Time Out, the Chicago Tribune, and the San Francisco Chronicle.

Plot
Urbania follows Charlie (Dan Futterman) through a sleepless night. After an unsuccessful bout of masturbation to the sound of his upstairs neighbors having sex, he prowls the streets looking for a man he saw several months earlier. The implication is that he's had a one night stand with the man, cheating on his boyfriend Chris (Matt Keeslar). This is reinforced by several phone calls Charlie places, leaving messages on Chris' answering machine. As he's walking, he has momentary flashes akin to hallucinations or waking dreams: a man's mouth; a bottle breaking; a man with a blood-stained shirt.

After a series of encounters (with his upstairs neighbors, whom he tells about his masturbatory activities, and a potential trick), he meets the man he's looking for. His name is Dean (Samuel Ball) and it makes no sense either that he'd trick with Charlie or that Charlie would trick with him. Dean is unabashedly racist, sexist and homophobic. Nevertheless, Charlie, pretending to be straight, buys Dean drinks and smokes a joint with him. Dean takes Charlie to a gay cruising area looking for victims, but Charlie is able to warn away the intended target. Dean is now almost incapacitated by alcohol and drugs and Charlie gets him into Dean's car and drives him to a secluded marshy area.

As had been implied by Charlie's flashbacks, Dean and two of his buddies, several months earlier, had attacked Charlie and raped and murdered Chris in an apparent hate crime. Charlie's purpose is finally revealed: he wants revenge.

In a dreamlike conversation with Chris, Charlie relates what happened at the marshland. He pulled a knife on Dean and told him why he was there. Dean didn't remember him. Charlie forced Dean to drop his pants and was disgusted to see Dean had an erection. Charlie forced Dean to kneel and fellate the knife blade. Suddenly, Dean collapsed with an epileptic seizure. Charlie slit his throat.

Chris challenges Charlie, not believing that he killed Dean. Charlie admits that he wanted to but couldn't. Instead, he drove off in Dean's car, abandoning him in the marsh.

Charlie stands up from where he's been kneeling, at a makeshift memorial near where Chris was killed. He walks home and has one more hallucinatory flash. He sees himself on the street, cradling a dying Chris. He kisses Chris goodbye and passes by him. When he turns back, Chris is gone. Charlie makes it home and, finally, is able to sleep.

Charlie presents aspects of his story in the form of urban legends. The film references a number of urban legends, both by having characters describe them as they're depicted and by presenting random people experiencing them.

Reception
Urbania has an approval rating of 72% on Rotten Tomatoes, based on 29 critic reviews.

Awards and nominations
 L.A. Outfest Grand Jury Award, Outstanding American Narrative Feature (winner) - 2000 
 Philadelphia International Gay & Lesbian Film Festival Jury Prize, Best Feature (winner) - 2000
 Provincetown International Film Festival Audience Award Best Feature (winner) - 2000
 San Francisco International Lesbian & Gay Film Festival Best First Feature (winner) - 2000  
 Seattle International Film Festival Golden Space Needle Award, Best Actor, Dan Futterman (winner) - 2000
 Sundance Film Festival Grand Jury Prize, Dramatic (nominated) - 2000 
 GLAAD Media Awards Outstanding Film (Limited Release) (nominated) - 2001

DVD release
Urbania was released on Region 1 DVD on March 13, 2001.

References

External links
 
 
 

2000 films
2000 drama films
2000 independent films
2000 LGBT-related films
2000s English-language films
American drama films
American films based on plays
American independent films
American LGBT-related films
American nonlinear narrative films
Films based on urban legends
Films set in New York City
Films shot in New York City
Gay-related films
LGBT-related drama films
Lionsgate films
2000s American films